The National Guarantees Fund, S.A. is a government-sponsored guarantor of commercial loans, part of the Executive Branch of the Government of Colombia, that facilitates financing for micro, small, and medium businesses by offering financial guarantees.

References

Government agencies established in 1982
Ministry of Commerce, Industry and Tourism (Colombia)
Financial services companies of Colombia
1982 establishments in Colombia
Government-owned companies of Colombia